is an underground metro station on the Sendai Subway Nanboku Line in Wakabayashi-ku, Sendai, Miyagi Prefecture, Japan.

Lines

Station layout
Atagobashi Station is an underground station with a single island platform serving two tracks.

Platforms

History
Atagobashi Station opened on 15 July 1987.

Passenger statistics
In fiscal 2015, the station was used by an average of 2,042 passengers daily.

Surrounding area
 Japan National Route 4
 Atagobashi Bridge
 Atagobashi　Shrine

References

External links

 

Railway stations in Miyagi Prefecture
Sendai Subway Namboku Line
Railway stations in Japan opened in 1987